Nentón is a town and municipality in the Guatemalan department of Huehuetenango.  Its territory extends 717 km2 with a population of 45,679.  It became a municipality on December 5, 1876 and was formerly known as San Benito Nentón.  The population speaks Spanish and Chuj.

The Nentón town fair is from January 12 to 15 in honor of Santo Cristo de Esquipulas.

Administrative division

The municipality has 13 middle size settlements (Spanish: aldeas) and 24 small size settlements (Spanish: caseríos).

Archeological sites

Nentón's territory includes the following sites:

Franja Transversal del Norte 

The Northern Transversal Strip was officially created during the government of General Carlos Arana Osorio in 1970, by Legislative Decree 60-70, for agricultural development. The decree literally said: "It is of public interest and national emergency, the establishment of Agrarian Development Zones in the area included within the municipalities: San Ana Huista, San Antonio Huista, Nentón, Jacaltenango, San Mateo Ixtatán, and Santa Cruz Barillas in Huehuetenango; Chajul and San Miguel Uspantán in Quiché; Cobán, Chisec, San Pedro Carchá, Lanquín, Senahú, Cahabón and Chahal, in Alta Verapaz and the entire department of Izabal."

Climate

Nentón has a subtropical highland climate (Köppen: Cwb).

Geographic location

See also
 
 
 Franja Transversal del Norte
 List of places in Guatemala

References

Bibliography

 
 
 

Municipalities of the Huehuetenango Department